Platyptilia campsiptera is a species of moth in the family Pterophoridae. This species is endemic to New Zealand. This species has been classified as Nationally Vulnerable by the Department of Conservation.

Taxonomy
P. campsiptera was first described by Edward Meyrick in 1907 from a specimen collected by George Vernon Hudson in the Humboldt Range at approximately 1100m. In 1928 Hudson also described and illustrated the species.

Description
Meyrick described the species as follows:

Hudson noted that when resting P. campsiptera holds its forewing second digit downwards and almost at right angles to the first digit.

Distribution
It is endemic to New Zealand. As well as at its type locality, the species has been collected at Ben Lomond, Andersons Bay and Colac Bay. It has also been collected at McKinnon Pass.

Conservation status
This species has the "Nationally Vulnerable" conservation status under the New Zealand Threat Classification System.

References

Moths described in 1907
campsiptera
Endemic fauna of New Zealand
Moths of New Zealand
Endangered biota of New Zealand
Taxa named by Edward Meyrick
Endemic moths of New Zealand